Cemal Metin Bulutoğluları (born September 2, 1960) is the mayor of the capital of Northern Cyprus, North Nicosia's Nicosia Turkish Municipality (Turkish: Lefkoşa). He was born in Nicosia. He lived his childhood in Ortaköy Marmara neighbourhood and graduated from the Nicosia Turkish High School in 1979. He graduated from Eastham College of Technology in England. Cemal Metin Bulutoğluları is married with two children. He speaks fluent English.

External links
Nicosia Turkish Municipality bio

1960 births
Living people
People from North Nicosia
Mayors of North Nicosia
Turkish Cypriot politicians
Turkish Cypriot expatriates in the United Kingdom